Neny Lalao Rakotonirainy Ravalomanana (born 1953) is a Malagasy businesswoman and politician. When her husband, Marc Ravalomanana, was President of Madagascar from 2002 to 2009, she was First Lady of Madagascar.

Ravalomanana was born Lalao Harivelo Rakotonirainy in Antananarivo. She married Marc Ravalomanana in 1974 at a ceremony held in Imerikasinina. The couple have four children: Josoa, Tojo, Sarah, and Maika.

In April 2013, Lalao Ravalomanana put herself forward to run in the 2013 presidential election, an election in which her husband was barred from standing. However, Ravalomanana, who had recently returned from exile in South Africa where she lived with her husband, was barred from running for not having lived in Madagascar for 6 months before the poll Ravalomanana then publicly endorsed medical doctor and politician Jean Louis Robinson from Antananarivo.

From October 2015 to January 2020 Lalao Ravalomanana served as Mayor of Antananarivo.

See also
 Timeline of Antananarivo

References

External links 
 President and First Lady of Madagascar visits Lipscomb University, meets with business leaders (includes photos of Lalao Ravalomanana]
 

Living people
1953 births
First ladies of Madagascar
Mayors of Antananarivo
Malagasy women in politics
Malagasy businesspeople
Malagasy politicians
People from Antananarivo
21st-century Malagasy women politicians
21st-century Malagasy politicians